The Palace of Pleasure is a 1926 American silent drama film directed by Emmett J. Flynn and written by Benjamin Glazer and Bradley King. The film stars Betty Compson, Edmund Lowe, Henry Kolker, Harvey Clark, Nina Romano, and Francis McDonald. The film was released on January 10, 1926, by Fox Film Corporation.

Plot
As described in a film magazine review, Don Sebastian, Portuguese Premier, sets a price on the head of royalist Ricardo Madons. Madons is in love with actress Lola Montez, whom Sebastian also adores. Madons abducts Lola and compels her to wed him, but then does not hold her to the compact. Lola, who is really in love with him, repents having sent for assistance when she was taken. When Sebastian's soldiers arrive, Lola is nearly slain when she stops a bullet meant for Madons. She plots successfully and escapes with Madons, and the couple find happiness across the border.

Cast
Betty Compson as Lola Montez
Edmund Lowe as Ricardo Madons
Henry Kolker as Don Sebastian, Premier
Harvey Clark as Police Chief
Nina Romano as Maid
Francis McDonald as Captain Fernandez
George Siegmann as Caesar

Preservation
With no prints of The Palace of Pleasure located in any film archives, it is a lost film.

See also
1937 Fox vault fire

References

External links

 
 
 Period lobby poster

1926 films
1920s English-language films
Fox Film films
Silent American drama films
1926 drama films
Films directed by Emmett J. Flynn
American black-and-white films
American silent feature films
Lost American films
1926 lost films
Lost drama films
1920s American films